Langørjan or Rye is a village in the municipality of Trondheim in Trøndelag county, Norway.

References

Geography of Trondheim
Villages in Trøndelag